Peter Graham (born 5 August 1975) is an Australian karateka, kickboxer, boxer and mixed martial artist.

Background
Originally from North Sydney, New South Wales, Australia, Graham began training in Kyokushin Karate at the age of 18. Graham quickly demonstrated his talents, winning his first tournament in an under yellow belt division about half a year later. In 1999 at the age of 23, Graham won the Amateur Australian and New Zealand Open Weight Championships and soon also became the South Pacific Champion. Graham then moved to Ikebukuro in Tokyo, Japan to further hone his skills and live in a dojo. However, Graham only completed three months of this rigorous training before having to return to Australia after his brother Matthew died of a heroin overdose. Graham would earn his black belt in only five years.

Kickboxing career
Graham began kickboxing and boxing at the age of 21 and before turning professional he captured the World Kickboxing Federation World Amateur Heavyweight Championship from New Zealand's Shane Wijohn, finishing his amateur career undefeated (17-0). Graham turned professional in 2000 and attained instant success, defeating Ben Hamilton in K-1 Oceania Revenge by TKO and then Clay Aumitagi.

On 19 November 2000 he became the first Australian to go ten rounds with the legendary Stan "The Man" Longinidis.

In 2001 he defeated Mark Hunt, the K-1 World GP Champion of the year. He won his second WKBF Super Heavyweight title the next year, and won the Kings of Oceania 2004 championship after defeating his long-term rival Jason Suttie.

In 2006, Peter had a feud with Badr Hari in K-1 World Grand Prix 2006 in Auckland. Hari mocked Graham that he is a has-been, and Hari is the future. A brawl at the press conference instigated by Hari kissing Graham hyped up their match. The real match was won by Peter, who won by knockout via his trademark "Rolling Thunder" spinning kick, which broke Hari's jaw. Hari was sidelined for almost a year.

On 31 December 2006 at K-1 PREMIUM 2006 Dynamite!!, Graham fought against the four time K-1 heavyweight champion, Dutch man from the Seidokaikan dojo Semmy Schilt in a 5-round match and lost by unanimous decision (3-0).

On 5 August 2007, Graham and Hari met for a revenge fight in K-1 World GP 2007 in Hong Kong as one of the three super bouts of the event, held in Hong Kong for the very first time. This time, Hari was more alert to the threat of a Rolling Thunder by Graham. Both fighters could not show their top performances as Hari won the fight by points. Graham tried the Rolling Thunder Kick twice in the last moments of the fight, but could not connect with Hari.

In a rematch with Doug Viney at Kings of Kombat in Keysborough, Victoria on 29 August 2010, Graham won via TKO in the fifth round to claim the ISKA World Heavyweight Championship. Graham lost the title to Paul Slowinski, in the third fight between them, when he lost by a third-round KO at King of Kombat 4 on 20 August 2011.

He has returned to kickboxing to fight Prince Ali at HEAT 24 in Nagoya, Japan on 7 October 2012, winning the fight via decision.

He is competed in a Heavyweight Tournament at GFC Series 1 in Dubai on 29 May 2014, defeating Arnold Oborotov via an extension round majority decision in the semi-finals before losing to Badr Hari by first-round TKO in the final.

Mixed martial arts career
After training with PRIDE veteran Akira Shoji, Peter made his MMA debut in World Victory Road on 5 March 2008 against the seasoned Japanese MMA fighter Kazuyuki Fujita, and was defeated by submission in the first round. Graham undeterred by the loss returned to for the World Victory Road Presents: Sengoku 4, where he again he fought valiantly in a much closer match against French grappler Moise Rimbon but Graham was submitted early in the second round.

Over the course of the following two years Graham proceed to hone his BJJ skills in Brazil, earning a blue belt, and continued to fight at elite level matches around the globe matched against the likes of Rolles Gracie Jr. In July 2010 Graham defeated American K-1 Champion Carter Williams.

On 8 December 2010, Graham defeated Alexander Emelianenko by TKO via leg kicks halfway through the second round. This marks Graham's biggest win in MMA to date.

In 2012, Graham defeated Konstantin Gluhov twice by KO & TKO.

Following the second Gluhov fight, he returned home to fight at Australian Fighting Championship (AFC) 4, defeating Donnie Lester by TKO 1:50 of Round 1, in December 2012.

Graham was scheduled to fight upcoming MMM star Tai Tuivasa in Combat8 at C8:03, a Mixed Rules Australian MMA organization. Graham defeated Tai Tuivasa by TKO in the second round in a back and forth fight, making that his eighth KO/TKO MMA win so far.

Graham Beat Salimgirey Rasulov by TKO due to injury of Rasulov's broken arm in Russia on 2 June.

Bellator MMA
He signed with Bellator MMA in July 2013. He debuted at Bellator 104 on 18 October 2013 when he faced Eric Prindle. He won the fight by unanimous decision which marks the first MMA fight Graham had that went the distance.

In late October, Graham was announced as the injury replacement in the Bellator Season Nine Heavyweight Tournament. He faced Cheick Kongo on 8 November 2013 at Bellator 107.  He lost the fight via unanimous decision.

On 7 March 2014, Graham faced Mighty Mo in the Bellator Season Ten Heavyweight Tournament at Bellator 111. Despite winning the first 2 rounds, Graham would lose via submission in the third round.

Konfrontacja Sztuk Walki
After going 1–2 in Bellator MMA, Graham returned to MMA competition in Poland at KSW 28 versus Marcin Rózalski on 4 October 2014. He won via TKO due to a leg injury in the second round. Graham next faced Karol Bedorf at KSW 31 on May 23, 2015. He lost the fight via unanimous decision. Graham faced Mariusz Pudzianowski at KSW 32: Road to Wembley on Halloween night 2015. Held at the Wembley Arena in London, the event was the first produced by KSW to take place outside of Poland. Graham won the fight via TKO in the second round.

Fight Nights Global
On June 17, 2016 Graham faced Vitaly Minakov at Fight Nights Global 50: Fedor vs. Maldonado. He lost the bout via armbar submission at just over a minute into the first round.

Championships and achievements

Boxing
 Australian National Boxing Federation
Australian Heavyweight Championship (One time)
New South Wales State Heavyweight Championship (One time)
 World Boxing Foundation
World Boxing Foundation World Heavyweight Championship (One time) 2016
 World Boxing Organization
WBO Asia Pacific Heavyweight Championship (One time)

Karate
 South Pacific Karate Champion
 1999 Australian Kyokushin Openweight Champion
 1999 New Zealand Kyokushin Openweight Champion

Kickboxing
 International Sport Karate Association
 ISKA World Heavyweight Championship (One time)

 K-1
 2001 K-1 World Grand Prix Preliminary Melbourne Runner Up
 2003 K-1 World Grand Prix in Melbourne Champion
 2004 Kings of Oceania Champion

 World Kick Boxing Federation
 WKBF Amateur Super Heavyweight Championship (One time)
 WKBF World Super Heavyweight Championship (One time)

Mixed martial arts
 Bellator MMA
 Bellator MMA Season 9 Heavyweight Tournament Runner-Up

Personal life
Peter Graham grew up in Sydney NSW Australia he was a street kid that lived in youth refuges till he was 20. Starting karate at 18, in just two short years and with the help from this karate dojo and his own savings, Graham moved to Tokyo that same year, to study Kyokushin as an elite karate prospect. After the tragic heroin overdose of his older brother he returned to Australia to bury him and start his journey back to Japan and to K1 kickboxing greatest heights. Five years later he won the amateur kickboxing world titles undefeated and turning pro he returned to Japan to fight K1 and eventually to married a Brazilian woman living in Tokyo on 22 June 2008. He got a tattoo on his right arm reading her name, "Silvia". They have two daughters together, and in 2010, Graham appeared on the TV program "Find My Family" where he was re-united with his younger brother who he had lost contact with and hadn't seen in 20 years. In 2012 he opened up his own full-time martial arts and combat sports school Prospect IMC at Prospect New South Wales, Australia.

Mixed martial arts record

| Loss
| align=center| 11–10
| Vitaly Minakov
| Submission (armbar)
| Fight Nights Global 50: Fedor vs. Maldonado
| 
| align=center| 1
| align=center|1:01
| St. Petersburg, Russia
| 
|-
| Win
| align=center| 11–9
| Mariusz Pudzianowski
| TKO (punches and elbows)
| KSW 32: Road to Wembley
| 
| align=center| 2
| align=center| 2:00
| London, England
|
|-
| Loss
| align=center| 10–9
| Karol Bedorf
| Decision (unanimous)
| KSW 31: Materla vs. Drwal
| 
| align=center| 3
| align=center| 5:00
| Gdańsk, Poland
|
|-
| Loss
| align=center| 10–8
| Denis Goltsov
| Submission (kimura) 
| Tech-Krep FC - Ermak Prime Challenge
| 
| align=center| 2
| align=center| 3:23
| Krasnodar, Russia
|
|-
| Win
| align=center| 10–7
| Marcin Różalski
| TKO (Knee Injury)
| KSW 28: Fighters Den
| 
| align=center| 2
| align=center| 0:43
| Szczecin, Poland
|
|-
| Loss
| align=center| 9–7
| Mighty Mo
| Submission (arm-triangle choke)
| Bellator 111
| 
| align=center| 3
| align=center| 2:31
| Thackerville, Oklahoma, United States
| Bellator Season 10 Heavyweight Tournament Quarterfinal
|-
| Loss
| align=center| 9–6
| Cheick Kongo
| Decision (unanimous)
| Bellator 107
| 
| align=center| 3
| align=center| 5:00
| Thackerville, Oklahoma, United States
| 
|-
| Win
| align=center| 9–5
| Eric Prindle
| Decision (unanimous)
| Bellator 104
| 
| align=center| 3
| align=center| 5:00
| Cedar Rapids, Iowa, United States
| 
|-
| Win
| align=center| 8–5
| Salimgirey Rasulov 
| TKO (injury)
| K-1 Global MMA
| 
| align=center| 2
| align=center| 1:00
| Krasnodar Krai, Russia
| 
|-
| Win
| align=center| 7–5
| Donnie Lester
| TKO (corner stoppage)
| AFC 4
| 
| align=center| 1
| align=center| 1:50
| Melbourne, Australia
| 
|-
| Win
| align=center| 6–5
| Konstantin Gluhov
| TKO (punches)
| Draka 11
| 
| align=center| 1
| align=center| 3:20
| Khabarovsk, Russia
| 
|-
| Win
| align=center| 5–5
| Konstantin Gluhov
| KO (punch)
| Governor's Cup 2012
| 
| align=center| 1
| align=center| 2:47
| Khabarovsk, Russia
| 
|-
| Win
| align=center| 4–5
| Alexander Emelianenko
| TKO (leg kicks)
| Draka 5
| 
| align=center| 2
| align=center| 2:59
| Khabarovsk, Russia
| Special rules allowing :30 on the ground.
|-
| Win
| align=center| 3–5
| Yusuke Kawaguchi
| TKO (elbows)
| Xtreme MMA 3
| 
| align=center| 1
| align=center| N/A
| Sydney, Australia
| 
|-
| Win
| align=center| 2–5
| Carter Williams
| TKO (strikes)
| Xtreme MMA 2
| 
| align=center| 1
| align=center| 4:10
| Sydney, Australia
| 
|-
| Loss
| align=center| 1–5
| Jim York
| Submission (rear naked choke)
| Impact FC 2
| 
| align=center| 1
| align=center| 3:44
| Sydney, Australia
| 
|-
| Loss
| align=center| 1–4
| Dion Staring
| Submission (armbar)
| Fury 1: Clash of the Titans
| 
| align=center| 1
| align=center| N/A
| Macau, China
| 
|-
| Win
| align=center| 1–3
| Felise Leniu
| TKO (punches)
| RPA: Return of the Chief
| 
| align=center| 1
| align=center| N/A
| Keysborough, Australia
| 
|-
| Loss
| align=center| 0–3
| Rolles Gracie
| Submission (arm-triangle choke)
| Art of War 14
| 
| align=center| 1
| align=center| 1:43
| Macau, China
| 
|-
| Loss
| align=center| 0–2
| Moise Rimbon
| Submission (rear naked choke)
| World Victory Road Presents: Sengoku 4
| 
| align=center| 2
| align=center| 0:42
| Saitama, Saitama, Japan
| 
|-
| Loss
| align=center| 0–1
| Kazuyuki Fujita
| Submission (north-south choke)
| World Victory Road Presents: Sengoku First Battle
| 
| align=center| 1
| align=center| 1:23
| Tokyo, Japan
|

MMA mixed rules record

|-
|Win
|align=center|1–0
|Tai Tuivasa
|TKO (punches)
|Combat8:03
|
|align=center|2
|align=center|2:55
|Big Top Sydney, New South Wales, Australia
|

Kickboxing record

Professional boxing record

See also
List of mixed martial artists with professional boxing records

References

External links
 
 
 
 
  

1975 births
Sportsmen from New South Wales
Kickboxers from Sydney
Australian male kickboxers
Heavyweight kickboxers
Boxers from Sydney
Heavyweight boxers
Australian male mixed martial artists
Heavyweight mixed martial artists
Australian male karateka
Australian practitioners of Brazilian jiu-jitsu
Mixed martial artists utilizing boxing
Mixed martial artists utilizing American Kenpo
Mixed martial artists utilizing Kyokushin kaikan
Mixed martial artists utilizing judo
Mixed martial artists utilizing Brazilian jiu-jitsu
Australian expatriate sportspeople in Japan
Living people
Australian male boxers
World Boxing Organization champions